Derick Heathcoat-Amory, 1st Viscount Amory,  (26 December 1899 – 20 January 1981) was a British Conservative politician and member of the House of Lords.

He served as Chancellor of the Exchequer between 1958 and 1960, and later as Chancellor of the University of Exeter from 1972 until his death in 1981.

Background and education
Born in London, the son of Sir Ian Heathcoat-Amory, 2nd Baronet (see Heathcoat-Amory baronets) and Alexandra Georgina (OBE; who d. 1942), eldest daughter of Vice-Admiral Henry Seymour CB (brother of  Francis, 5th Marquess of Hertford GCB).

He was educated at Ludgrove School followed by Eton College and Christ Church, Oxford, receiving an MA degree.

His great-nephews include the Rt Hon David Heathcoat-Amory and Sir Ian Heathcoat-Amory, 6th and present baronet. A great-aunt was the sculptress, Princess Victor of Hohenlohe-Langenburg, Countess von Gleichen.

Career
Heathcoat-Amory was elected a Devon County Councillor in 1932 and worked in textile manufacturing and banking. He was commissioned a second lieutenant in the 11th (Devonshire) Brigade of the Royal Artillery (Territorial Army) on 31 July 1920, promoted to lieutenant in the 96th (Royal Devonshire Yeomanry) Field Brigade on 31 July 1922 and promoted to captain on 1 September 1926. He was promoted to major on 1 October 1935. During the Second World War, he was wounded and captured during Operation Market-Garden. He retired on 1 September 1948 with the honorary rank of lieutenant-colonel.

He was elected Member of Parliament for Tiverton in 1945 (a constituency previously held by his grandfather Sir John Heathcoat-Amory, 1st Baronet). When the Conservatives came to power under Winston Churchill in 1951 he was appointed Minister of Pensions. In September 1953 he was appointed Minister of State for Trade. He joined Churchill's Cabinet in July 1954 succeeding Sir Thomas Dugdale as Minister of Agriculture and Fisheries (continuing his responsibilities as Minister of State for Trade). In October 1954 these ministries merged under Heathcoat-Amory's leadership. The Hon. Gwilym Lloyd George later Viscount Tenby had previously been charged with Food ministerial affairs. He remained in this post until being appointed Chancellor of the Exchequer in 1958, by Harold Macmillan, an office he held until 1960. A highlight of Amory's chancellorship was the raising of Bank Rate to 6% in June 1960, in an effort to cool the economy after the election the previous autumn.

He stood down from the House of Commons in 1960 and was raised to the peerage as Viscount Amory, of Tiverton in the County of Devon, on 1 September of that year. From 1965 to 1970, he was Governor (Company Chairman) of the Hudson's Bay Company, North America's oldest company (established by English royal charter in 1670). Viscount Amory was sworn of the Privy Council in 1953, appointed GCMG in 1961 and KG in 1968. He also received the degree of Hon. LLD (Exon) in 1959, before serving as Chancellor of Exeter University from 1972 to 1981.

Personal life
Heathcoat-Amory was an accomplished sailor, who had his yacht brought up the Thames to take him away after making Budget speeches when Chancellor of the Exchequer.  The Civil Service Sailing Association continues to award the annual Heathcoat Amory Trophy (donated by Viscount Amory) for outstanding sailing achievements by its members.

In 1972, Lord Amory succeeded his brother in the family baronetcy; he died unmarried in January 1981, aged 81. The viscountcy became extinct upon his death and his younger brother succeeded him as Sir William Heathcoat-Amory, 5th Baronet, DSO.

National honours

  – KG
  – Bt
  – GCMG
  – TD

See also 
 Heathcoat-Amory baronets
 Viscount

References

Further reading
 Dell, Edmund. The Chancellors: A History of the Chancellors of the Exchequer, 1945-90 (HarperCollins, 1997) pp 242–57, covers his term as Chancellor.

External links 
 
 Burke's Peerage

1899 births
1981 deaths
Heathcoat-Amory, Derick
Alumni of Christ Church, Oxford
British Army personnel of World War II
Heathcoat-Amory, Derick
Chancellors of the University of Exeter
Heathcoat-Amory, Derick
Conservative Party (UK) hereditary peers
Councillors in South West England
Deputy Lieutenants of Devon
Governors of the Hudson's Bay Company
Knights Grand Cross of the Order of St Michael and St George
Knights of the Garter
Heathcoat-Amory, Derick
Members of the Privy Council of the United Kingdom
Ministers in the Eden government, 1955–1957
Ministers in the Macmillan and Douglas-Home governments, 1957–1964
Ministers in the third Churchill government, 1951–1955
Viscounts created by Elizabeth II
People educated at Eton College
Royal Artillery officers
Gay politicians
LGBT peers
English LGBT politicians
LGBT members of the Parliament of the United Kingdom
Heathcoat-Amory, Derick
Heathcoat-Amory, Derick
Heathcoat-Amory, Derick
Heathcoat-Amory, Derick
Heathcoat-Amory, Derick
UK MPs who were granted peerages
Viscounts in the Peerage of the United Kingdom
Operation Market Garden
Military personnel from London
People educated at Ludgrove School
Politicians from Tiverton, Devon